Spitfire Records was a subsidiary of Eagle Rock Entertainment located in New York City, United States.

In September 1998, Paul Bibeau founded, launched and rapidly developed Spitfire Records Inc. from a two-man operation located in his home bedroom in suburban Long Island, New York, to one of the premier independent record labels worldwide. The label experienced consistent growth from start-up, Mr. Bibeau successfully negotiated a partnership with Eagle Rock Entertainment (Eagle Vision), a London, England-based audio and visual company.

Releases
 Crimson Glory – Astronomica – 1999
 Testament – The Gathering – 1999
Pride & Glory – Pride & Glory (reissue) – 1999
 Zakk Wylde –  Book of Shadows  (reissue) – 1999
 Black Label Society – Sonic Brew – 1999
 Eric Carr – Rockology – 1999
 Sebastian Bach – Bring 'Em Bach Alive! – 1999
 TNT – Transistor – 1999
 Enuff Z'Nuff – Paraphernalia – 1999
 N17 – Defy Everything – 1999
 Raven –  Rock Until You Drop (reissue) – 1999
 Raven –  Wiped Out (reissue) – 1999
 Raven –  All for One (reissue) – 1999
 Race Riot – 2000
 Napalm Death – Enemy of the Music Business – 2000
 Alice Cooper – Brutal Planet – 2000
 Enuff Z'Nuff – 10 – 2000
 Dio – Magica – 2000
 Sixty Watt Shaman – Seed of Decades – 2000
 Black Label Society – Stronger than Death – 2000
 Britny Fox – Long Way to Live! – 2001
 Alice Cooper – Dragontown – 2001
 Apocalyptica – Cult – 2001
 Europe – Prisoners in Paradise (reissue) – 2001
 Lita Ford –  Stiletto (reissue) – 2001
 Lita Ford – Dangerous Curves (reissue) – 2001
 Cradle of Filth – Bitter Suites to Succubi – 2001
 Karma to Burn – Almost Heathen – 2001
 Last Hard Men – 2001
 Ted Nugent – Full Bluntal Nugity – 2001
 Black Label Society – Alcohol Fueled Brewtality Live +5 – 2001
 Dog Fashion Disco – Anarchists of Good Taste – 2001
 My Ruin – A Prayer Under Pressure of Violent Anguish – 2001
 Overkill – Wrecking Everything – 2002
 Dio – Killing the Dragon – 2002
 Sixty Watt Shaman – Reason to Live – 2002
 Danzig – I Luciferi – 2002
 Ted Nugent – Craveman – 2002
 Britny Fox – Springhead Motorshark – 2003
 Overkill – Killbox 13 – 2003
 Dog Fashion Disco – Committed to a Bright Future – 2003
 The Exploited – Fuck the System – 2003
 Therapy? – High Anxiety – 2003
 Black Label Society – The Blessed Hellride – 2003
 Cathedral – The VIIth Coming – 2003
 The Go-Go's –  God Bless the Go-Go's (reissue) – 2004
 Black Label Society – Hangover Music Vol. VI – 2004
 Therapy? – Never Apologise Never Explain – 2004
 Overkill – ReliXIV – 2005
 Beautiful Creatures – Deuce – 2005
 Rich Ward – My Kung Fu Is Good – 2005
 Nashville Pussy – Get Some! – 2005
 Therapy? – One Cure Fits All – 2006

See also
 List of record labels

References 

American record labels
Rock record labels
Heavy metal record labels